The Minister of Foreign Affairs of the Czech Republic is a senior official of the Government of the Czech Republic, and as the head of the Ministry of Foreign Affairs is concerned with foreign policy and foreign relations of the Czech Republic.

The Minister of Foreign Affairs is appointed by the President after being nominated by the Prime Minister.

The Minister of Foreign Affairs along with the Finance Minister, the Minister of Defence, and the Minister of the Interior are generally regarded as the four most important cabinet members because of the importance of their respective ministries.

The current  Minister of Foreign Affairs of the Czech Republic is Jan Lipavský.

List of Ministers of Foreign Affairs of the Czech Republic

See also 
 Ministry of Foreign Affairs (Czech Republic)

Lists of political office-holders in the Czech Republic
Foreign Ministers of the Czech Republic